Marta Kristen is a Norwegian-born American actress.

Kristen is best known for her role as Judy Robinson, the oldest child of Professor John Robinson and his wife, Maureen, in the television series Lost in Space (1965–1968). Her character was a young adult, around 20 years of age.

Early life
Kristen was born Birgit Annalisa Rusanen in Oslo, Norway, to a Finnish mother and a German soldier father who was killed during World War II. She spent her first years in an orphanage in Norway, and was then adopted in 1949 by a couple from Detroit, Michigan, Harold Oliver Soderquist, and his wife, Bertha, who renamed her Martha Annalise Soderquist. Her adoptive father was a professor of education at Wayne University, Detroit. Kristen has a brother whom her parents adopted.

In 1959, Kristen moved to Los Angeles, California when her father was on a sabbatical. She remained there, with a guardian, and is a graduate of Santa Monica High School.

Career 
  Reflecting her Scandinavian heritage, Kristen adopted the more European-sounding "Marta" and used Marta Kristen as her stage name. She first appeared in a 1961 episode of Alfred Hitchcock Presents, "Bang! You're Dead", alongside Billy Mumy, who later co-starred with Kristen in Lost in Space.  In 1963, she starred with Tony Dow in "Four Feet in the Morning," an episode of The Eleventh Hour.

Kristen's first film role was in the 1963 Walt Disney production of Savage Sam.  She played the role of Lorelei in the 1965 movie Beach Blanket Bingo. 

Kristen starred in Lost in Space from its beginning in 1965 until its cancellation in 1968.  Afterwards, she had a daughter, born in 1969, and appeared in more than forty television commercials as well as making numerous guest appearances on television shows.  She also appeared in the A&E biography Jonathan Harris:  Never Fear, Smith Is Here in 2002.

She also made the occasional film appearance in movies such as Terminal Island (1973), Once in 1974, appearing as a bare breasted 'Humanity', and the science-fiction film Battle Beyond the Stars (1980); and had a cameo role in the 1998 movie Lost in Space.  Kristen also provided voice work for the 2009 animated theatrical short "The Bolt Who Screwed Christmas" which also included voice work from her Lost in Space co-stars Harris, Mumy, and Angela Cartwright.

Personal life

Kristen has been married twice. Her first marriage was to Terry Treadwell, a psychologist. She met her second husband, Kevin P. Kane, in 1974 and they married on November 18, 1978. They lived in Santa Monica, California, with two rescue dogs until 2016, when Kristen announced on her Facebook page that Kane had died.

References

External links

 
 

Living people
American film actresses
American television actresses
Norwegian emigrants to the United States
American adoptees
20th-century American actresses
21st-century American actresses
American people of Finnish descent
American people of German descent
Actresses from Los Angeles
Actresses from Santa Monica, California
20th-century Norwegian women
Year of birth missing (living people)